Esther L. George (born January 15, 1958 in Faucett, Missouri) was president and chief executive of the Federal Reserve Bank of Kansas City from 2011 until 2023.

George is a native of Faucett, Missouri, U.S., and received a BSBA degree in Business Administration from Missouri Western State University and an MBA degree from the University of Missouri-Kansas City. She is a graduate of the American Bankers Association's Stonier Graduate School of Banking and the Stanford Graduate School of Business.

She joined the Federal Reserve Bank of Kansas City in 1982 and held various leadership positions with the Bank, including in the Bank's research support functions, Public Affairs and Human Resources.  In 2001 she became the bank's senior vice president in the Bank's Division of Supervision and Risk Management.  In 2009 she was named executive vice president in charge of the unit. She is a former chair of the Federal Reserve System's Community Banking Organizations Management Group.

She was appointed to the Kansas City Fed President position on October 1, 2011. She retired on January 31, 2023 after reaching the mandatory retirement age for Federal Reserve Bank Presidents.

References

1958 births
Living people
Federal Reserve Bank of Kansas City presidents
Missouri Western State University alumni
People from Buchanan County, Missouri
Stanford Graduate School of Business alumni
University of Missouri–Kansas City alumni